Wake Up is the debut studio album by Swedish singer Jessica Andersson. The album was released in November 2009 and peaked at number 10 on the Swedish Albums Chart.

Track listing

Charts

Release history

References 

2009 debut albums
Jessica Andersson albums